During the 1991–92 English football season, Reading F.C. competed in the Football League Third Division, FA Cup, League Cup and League Trophy. It was their first season with Mark McGhee as their player-manager and they finished in 12th place in the league. They also reached Round 3 of the FA Cup, Round 1 of the League Cup and the Southern Primarily Group of the League Trophy.

Squad

Left club during season

Transfers

In

Loans In

Out

Released

Competitions

Division Three

Results

League table

FA Cup

League Cup

Autoglass Trophy

Squad statistics

Appearances and goals

|-
|colspan="14"|Players who appeared for Reading but left during the season:

|}

Goal Scorers

Team kit
Reading's kit for the 1991–92 was manufactured by Matchwinner, and the main sponsor was HAT Painting.

Notes

References

External links
 Soccerbase.com

Reading F.C. seasons
Reading